William Lyons was a car manufacturer.

William Lyons may also refer to:
William Lyons (philosopher)
William L. Lyons (1857–1911), U.S. politician
William Henry Holmes Lyons (1843–1924), political leader in Northern Ireland
William J. Lyons Jr. (1921–2014), U.S. politician
William D. Lyons (1920-1971), American coal miner and politician
William John Lyons (born 1966), English Christian theologian
William "Billy" Lyons, murdered by Lee Shelton
Bill Lyons (born 1958), American baseball player
Bill Lyons (screenwriter) (born 1945), actor turned writer for Emmerdale
Will Lyons (born 1976), British business correspondent and wine columnist
Billy Red Lyons (1932–2009), Canadian professional wrestler

See also
William Lyon (disambiguation)
Lyons (surname)